Kyle Joseph Downes (born March 18, 1983) is a Canadian-American actor, best known for his recurring role as Larry Tudgeman in the Disney Channel Original Series Lizzie McGuire and his characterization of Ezra Friedken in Higher Ground. He was born in Summertown, Tennessee. His other television acting credits include Are You Afraid of the Dark?, Boston Public, CSI: Miami, The Famous Jett Jackson, The L Word, Goosebumps and La Femme Nikita.

References

External links
 

1983 births
Living people
20th-century American male actors
21st-century American male actors
Male actors from Tennessee
American male child actors
American emigrants to Canada
American male film actors
American male television actors
American people of Canadian descent
People from Summertown, Tennessee